The 2000 Thalgo Australian Women's Hardcourts was a women's tennis tournament played on outdoor hard courts. It was the fourth edition of the event then known as the Thalgo Australian Women's Hardcourts, and was a Tier III event on the 2000 WTA Tour. It took place in Gold Coast, Queensland, Australia, from 2 January through 8 January 2000. Seventh-seeded Silvija Talaja won the singles title and earned $27,000 first-prize money.

Finals

Singles

 Silvija Talaja defeated  Conchita Martínez, 6–0, 0–6, 6–4
 It was Talaja's first singles title of her career.

Doubles

 Julie Halard-Decugis /  Anna Kournikova defeated  Sabine Appelmans /  Rita Grande, 6–3, 6–0

References

External links
 ITF tournament edition details
 Tournament draws

Thalgo Australian Women's Hardcourts
Brisbane International
Thal
Tennis on the Gold Coast, Queensland
2000 Thalgo Australian Women's Hardcourts